Vengeance of Rain (Chinese: 爪皇凌雨) (21 September 2000 – 25 October 2011) was a Thoroughbred racehorse in Hong Kong that won Dubai Sheema Classic (Int'l Group One (G1) over 2,400 metres), the joint richest turf race in the world.

Vengeance of Rain was foaled in New Zealand, trained by David E. Ferraris, ridden mostly by Anthony Delpech and owned by Raymond Gianco Chow Hon Man & Chow Chu May Ping. He was raced in Australia under the name Subscribe before being sold by his owner Lloyd Williams.

Vengeance of Rain's total stakes were over $7.9 million which rated in top 10 of the world. The Hong Kong Jockey Club made a website for Vengeance of Rain on 13 April 2007.

The Hong Kong Jockey Club also published the special edition octopus card for Vengeance of Rain on 30 May 2007. The octopus card is used to celebrate Vengeance of Rain winning the Dubai Sheema Classic on 31 March 2007 and he was crowned the 2006-2007 Hong Kong Horse of the Year on 2 July 2007.

Vengeance of Rain broke the all-time Hong Kong prize money record set by Silent Witness.

Vengeance of Rain died at the Cambridge Stud, where he had been foaled, in October 2011.

References

 Race record with videos for Vengeance of Rain at the Hong Kong Jockey Club

2000 racehorse births
2011 racehorse deaths
Thoroughbred family 1-o
Racehorses bred in New Zealand
Racehorses trained in Australia
Racehorses trained in Hong Kong